Lithuania participated in the Eurovision Song Contest 1999, held on 29 May 1999 at the International Convention Center in Jerusalem, Israel, with the song "Strazdas" written by Linas Rimša and Sigitas Geda and performed by Aistė. The Lithuanian broadcaster Lithuanian National Radio and Television (LRT) returned to the Eurovision Song Contest after a four-year absence following their withdrawal in 1995. The Lithuanian entry for the 1999 contest was selected through the national final entitled "Eurovizijos" dainų konkurso nacionalinė atranka 1999, organized by LRT. Twelve songs competed in the national final, held on 27 December 1998 and later aired on 31 December, where a jury panel selected the winning song. "Strazdas" performed by Aistė received the most votes and was selected to represent the nation in the contest. Aistė performed as the opening entry for the show in position 1 at the international contest and at the close of the voting process, finished in 20th place, receiving 13 points.

Background

To this point, the nation first and only participation was in 1994 with the song "Lopšinė mylimai" performed by Ovidijus Vyšniauskas which placed twenty-fifth (last) in the final.

The Lithuanian national broadcaster, LRT, broadcasts the event within Lithuania and organises the selection process for the nation's entry. In 1994, LRT had selected its entry by the internal selection. However, the broadcaster opted for a national final for the first time to select nation's 1999 entry.

Before Eurovision

"Eurovizijos" dainų konkurso nacionalinė atranka 1999 

"Eurovizijos" dainų konkurso nacionalinė atranka 1999 was the national final format developed by LRT in order to select Lithuania's entry for the Eurovision Song Contest 1999. The competition, hosted by Vilija Grigonytė and Vytautas Kernagis, was recorded on 27 December 1998 at the LRT studios in Vilnius during the television program Muzikinis viešbutis, and was later aired on 31 December 1998. Both televoting and jury voting was used during the show, however only the votes of the jury decided the winner. The televote results showed that RebelHeart had won with 40%, with Aistė coming second with 33%. The jury selected Aistė with "Strazdas" as the winner, with only the points of the top four songs being announced.

At Eurovision
The Eurovision Song Contest 1999 took place at the International Convention Center in Jerusalem, Israel, on 29 May 1999. According to the Eurovision rules, the 23-country participant list for the contest was composed of: the previous year's winning country and host nation, the seventeen countries which had obtained the highest average points total over the preceding five contests, and any eligible countries which did not compete in the 1998 contest. Lithuania was one of the eligible countries which did not compete in the 1998 contest, and thus were permitted to participate. The running order for the contest was decided by a draw held on 17 November 1998; Lithuania was assigned to perform 1st at the 1999 contest, preceding Belgium's Vanessa Chinitor with "Like the Wind". After the voting concluded, Lithuania scored 13 points and placed 20th. At the time this result was the Lithuania's best placing in its competitive history.

Voting
The same voting system in use since 1975 was again implemented for 1999 contest, with each country providing 1–8, 10 and 12 points to the ten highest-ranking songs as determined by a selected jury or the viewing public through televoting, with countries not allowed to vote for themselves. Lithuania opted to assemble 8-member jury panel to determine which countries would receive their points. The Lithuanian spokesperson, who announced the points awarded by the Lithuanian jury during the final, was Andrius Tapinas. Below is a breakdown of points awarded to Lithuania and awarded by Lithuania in the grand final of the contest.

References

External links
Lithuanian National Final 1999

1999
Countries in the Eurovision Song Contest 1999
Eurovision